Jennie is an unincorporated community in Collinwood Township, Meeker County, Minnesota, United States.  The community is located near Dassel along 180th Street near 705th Avenue.

References

Unincorporated communities in Minnesota
Unincorporated communities in Meeker County, Minnesota